HMNZS Monowai (F59) was a former Peninsular and Oriental Steam Navigation Company (P&O) merchant vessel. At the outbreak of World War II she became an armed merchant cruiser of the Royal New Zealand Navy (RNZN). She subsequently became HMS Monowai, a Landing Ship, Infantry and mostly operated as a troopship. In 1946 she returned to her old trade as a passenger ship.

Civilian career
SS Razmak was built at Greenock yard for P&O by Harland and Wolff, launched in 1924 and completed on 26 February 1925. She was designed for service between Bombay and Aden and spent several years in the Mediterranean Sea. When demand on her original route dried up, she was offered for sale and transferred to the antipodes. The Union Steam Ship Company, part of the P & O group, took her on in 1930 as their second  and she ran a subsidized service from Wellington to Vancouver via several Pacific stops. From 24 November 1932 she ran mostly from Wellington to Sydney.

Conversion to armed merchant cruiser
Guns suitable for Monowai had been ordered and stored at the Devonport Naval Base in Auckland. Monowai was requisitioned by the Royal New Zealand Navy on 21 October 1939 and was prepared for mounting the guns. Then followed a period of indecision, and in February 1940 work on her was suspended for over four months. After construction was completed in August 1940, she was commissioned.

The  conducted an unsuccessful attack on her on 16 January 1942.

Monowai was the first of two ships with this name to serve in the Royal New Zealand Navy. She was named after the New Zealand glacial lake Monowai. Monowai is a Māori word meaning "channel full of water".

Conversion to LSI
As surplus, in 1943 she was transferred to Liverpool in the United Kingdom and handed over to the British Ministry of War Transport. Monowai went to Glasgow for conversion to an "Landing Ship, Infantry (Large)" or LSI(L). From June 1943 to February 1944 she was refitted with completely different armament, capacity for up to 1,800 fully equipped troops, and 20 Assault Landing Craft. She was used during the Normandy landings.

In the later period of the war she was used as a troopship transporting soldiers and after the end of the war in repatriation.

Post war
On 31 August 1946 she was returned to her owner. She resumed merchant service in January 1949 after extensive repair. In 1960 she was sold for breaking up in Hong Kong.

Notes, citations, and references

Notes

Citations

References

External links
TSS Monowai 1925–1960
Monowai - A Steamships Of Many Faces

1924 ships
Amphibious warfare vessels of the Royal Navy
Auxiliary cruisers of the Royal New Zealand Navy
Ships built on the River Clyde
Merchant ships of the United Kingdom
Ministry of War Transport ships
Ocean liners
Ships of the Union Steam Ship Company
Troop ships
World War II amphibious warfare vessels of the United Kingdom
Ships built by Harland and Wolff